The following is a list of radio stations in the Canadian province of Ontario, .

Note that stations are listed by their legal community of license, which in some cases may not be the city where studios and/or transmitter are. (For instance, some stations which target Toronto, such as CFNY-FM and CIDC-FM, are officially licensed to outlying communities in the Greater Toronto Area rather than the city itself.)

List of radio stations

See also
 Lists of radio stations in North and Central America
 Media in Canada

References

External links
Canadian Communications Foundation 
Ontario - Canadian Radio Directory - Radio Stations
Radio Station World - Ontario
Radio Stations in Ontario - Canadian Communication Foundation

Ontario
Radio stations